is a Shinto shrine located in the city of Inazawa, Aichi Prefecture, Japan. It was the sōja of Owari Province. The main kami enshrined is Ōkuninushi. The shrine's main festival is held annually on May 6.

History
The original construction of this shrine is unknown. Although nominally dedicated to Ōkuninushi, this affiliation is uncertain, and the shrine asserts that it is dedicated to the tutelary spirits of the ancestors of the people of Owari. It became the sōja of Owari during the Nara period, and is mentioned in the Heian period Engishiki records. During the pre-World War II Modern system of ranked Shinto shrines, the shrine was ranked as a National Shrine, 3rd rank .

Two of the shrine's structures have been designated national Important Cultural Properties:
 Rōmon, built in early Muromachi period
 Heiden, built in the early Edo period

See also
List of Shinto shrines

References

External links

Official website

Shinto shrines in Aichi Prefecture
Owari Province
Inazawa
Beppyo shrines